Deal with the Devil is a cultural motif elemental to many Christian folktales.

Deal with the Devil may also refer to:
 Deal with the Devil (album), a 2000 album by Lizzy Borden, or the title song
 "Deal with the Devil" (Pop Evil song)
 "Deal with the Devil", a song by Judas Priest from Angel of Retribution 
 "Deal with the Devil", a song by Dale Watson from the 2001 album Every Song I Write is for You
 "Deal with the devil", a song by Japanese singer Tia
 The opening theme for the anime series Kakegurui

See also
 Dealing with the Devil: My Mother, Trump and Me, a 2020 book by Tony Schwartz, critical of Donald Trump